Isabel  (Elisabeth) is a classical crossover song in Spanish adapted for the quartet Il Divo, included in their album Ancora (2005).

The melody is based and developed from "Pavane in F-sharp minor, Op. 50". Gabriel Fauré, 1887.

With lyrics by Andreas Romdhane, 2005.

The song commemorates the French countess Élisabeth Greffulhe.

References 

Il Divo songs
1887 songs
2005 songs
Pop ballads
Songs written by Andreas Romdhane
Syco Music singles